William John Ellison (1943 - 16 March 2022) was a British mathematician who worked on number theory.

Ellison studied at the University of Cambridge, where he earned his bachelor's degree and then, after spending the academic year 1969/70 at the University of Michigan, his PhD in 1970 under John Cassels with thesis Waring's and Hilbert's 17th Problems. Subsequently he became a postdoc at the University of Bordeaux. In 1972 he received the Leroy P. Steele Prize and a Lester Randolph Ford Award for his article "Waring's Problem“, an exposition of Waring's problem

Selected works
 with Fern Ellison: Prime Numbers (Les nombres premiers, 1975). Wiley, New York 1985,  
 with Fern Ellison: Zahlentheorie In: Jean Dieudonné (ed.): Geschichte der Mathematik 1700 bis 1900 (Abrege d'histoire des mathematiques 1700–1900, 1978). Vieweg, Braunschweig 1985, online at archive.org, pp. 171–358,

References

1943 births
Living people
Number theorists
Alumni of the University of Cambridge
British mathematicians
20th-century British mathematicians
21st-century British mathematicians
University of Michigan alumni